This is a list of electoral divisions and wards in the ceremonial county of Suffolk in the East of England. All changes since the re-organisation of local government following the passing of the Local Government Act 1972 are shown. The number of councillors elected for each electoral division or ward is shown in brackets.

County council

Suffolk

1974–1985
Electoral Divisions from 1 April 1974 (first election 12 April 1973) to 2 May 1985:

1985–2005
Electoral Divisions from 2 May 1985 to 5 May 2005:

2005–2025
Electoral Divisions from 5 May 2005 to present:

District councils

Babergh
Wards from 1 April 1974 (first election 7 June 1973) to 3 May 1979:

Wards from 3 May 1979 to 1 May 2003:

Wards from 1 May 2003 to present:

(formerly) Forest Heath
Wards from 1 April 1974 (first election 7 June 1973) to 3 May 1979:

Wards from 3 May 1979 to 1 May 2003:

Wards from 1 May 2003 to 1 April 2019:

Ipswich
Wards from 1 April 1974 (first election 7 June 1973) to 3 May 1979:

Wards from 3 May 1979 to 2 May 2002:

Wards from 2 May 2002 to present:

Mid Suffolk
Wards from 1 April 1974 (first election 7 June 1973) to 3 May 1979:

Wards from 3 May 1979 to 1 May 2003:

Wards from 1 May 2003 to present:

(formerly) St Edmundsbury
Wards from 1 April 1974 (first election 7 June 1973) to 3 May 1979:

Wards from 3 May 1979 to 1 May 2003:

Wards from 1 May 2003 to 1 April 2019:

(formerly) Suffolk Coastal
Wards from 1 April 1974 (first election 7 June 1973) to 5 May 1983:

Wards from 5 May 1983 to 1 May 2003:

Wards from 1 May 2003 to 7 May 2015:

Wards from 7 May 2015 to 31 March 2019:

On 1 April 2019, the Districts of Suffolk Coastal and Waveney merged, to form East Suffolk District Council.

(formerly) Waveney
Wards from 1 April 1974 (first election 7 June 1973) to 5 May 1983:

Wards from 5 May 1983 to 2 May 2002:

Wards from 2 May 2002 to 31 March 2019:

On 1 April 2019, the Districts of Suffolk Coastal and Waveney merged, to form East Suffolk District Council.

East Suffolk
Following the merger of Waveney and Suffolk Coastal district councils on 1 April 2019, to form East Suffolk District, the council consists of 29 wards, represented by 55 councillors.

Wards from 1 April 2019 to present:

West Suffolk
Following the merger of St Edmundsbury Borough Council and Forest District councils on 1 April 2019, to form West Suffolk District, the council consists of 43 wards, represented by 64 councillors.
Wards from 1 April 2019 to present:

Electoral wards by parliamentary constituency

Bury St Edmunds
Abbeygate, Bacton and Old Newton, Badwell Ash, Eastgate, Elmswell and Norton, Fornham, Gislingham, Great Barton, Haughley and Wetherden, Horringer and Whelnetham, Minden, Moreton Hall, Needham Market, Northgate, Onehouse, Pakenham, Rattlesden, Rickinghall and Walsham, Ringshall, Risbygate, Rougham, St Olaves, Southgate, Stowmarket Central, Stowmarket North, Stowmarket South, Stowupland, Thurston and Hessett, Westgate, Woolpit.

Central Suffolk and North Ipswich
Barking and Somersham, Bramford and Blakenham, Castle Hill, Claydon and Barham, Debenham, Earl Soham, Eye, Framlingham, Fressingfield, Grundisburgh, Hacheston, Helmingham and Coddenham, Hoxne, Kesgrave East, Kesgrave West, Mendlesham, Otley, Palgrave, Rushmere St Andrew, Stradbroke and Laxfield, The Stonhams, Wetheringsett, Whitehouse, Whitton, Wickham Market, Witnesham, Worlingworth.

Ipswich
Alexandra, Bixley, Bridge, Gainsborough, Gipping, Holywells, Priory Heath, Rushmere, St John's, St Margaret's, Sprites, Stoke Park, Westgate.

South Suffolk
Alton, Berners, Boxford, Brett Vale, Brook, Bures St Mary, Cavendish, Chadacre, Clare, Dodnash, Glemsford and Stanstead, Great Cornard North, Great Cornard South, Hadleigh North, Hadleigh South, Holbrook, Lavenham, Leavenheath, Long Melford, Lower Brett, Mid Samford, Nayland, North Cosford, Pinewood, South Cosford, Sudbury East, Sudbury North, Sudbury South, Waldingfield.

Suffolk Coastal
Aldeburgh, Blything, Farlingaye, Felixstowe East, Felixstowe North, Felixstowe South, Felixstowe South East, Felixstowe West, Halesworth, Hollesley with Eyke, Kyson, Leiston, Martlesham, Melton and Ufford, Nacton, Orford and Tunstall, Peasenhall, Rendlesham, Riverside, Saxmundham, Seckford, Snape, Southwold and Reydon, Sutton, Trimleys with Kirton, Walberswick and Wenhaston, Wrentham, Yoxford.

Waveney
Beccles North, Beccles South, Bungay, Carlton, Carlton Colville, Gunton and Corton, Harbour, Kessingland, Kirkley, Lothingland, Normanston, Oulton, Oulton Broad, Pakefield, St Margaret's, The Saints, Wainford, Whitton, Worlingham.

West Suffolk
All Saints, Bardwell, Barningham, Barrow, Brandon East, Brandon West, Chedburgh, Eriswell and The Rows, Exning, Great Heath, Haverhill East, Haverhill North, Haverhill South, Haverhill West, Hundon, Iceni, Ixworth, Kedington, Lakenheath, Manor, Market, Red Lodge, Risby, St Mary's, Severals, South, Stanton, Wickhambrook, Withersfield.

See also
List of parliamentary constituencies in Suffolk

References

 
Suffolk